Great Brook is a  tributary of the Cold River in western New Hampshire in the United States.

See also

List of rivers of New Hampshire

References

Rivers of New Hampshire
Tributaries of the Connecticut River
Rivers of Sullivan County, New Hampshire